167 (one hundred [and] sixty-seven) is the natural number following 166 and preceding 168.

In mathematics
167 is an emirp, an isolated prime, a Chen prime, a Gaussian prime, a safe prime, and an Eisenstein prime with no imaginary part and a real part of the form .

167 is the smallest prime which can not be expressed as a sum of seven or fewer cubes.
It is also the smallest number which requires six terms when expressed using the greedy algorithm as a sum of squares, 167 = 144 + 16 + 4 + 1 + 1 + 1,
although by Lagrange's four-square theorem its non-greedy expression as a sum of squares can be shorter, e.g. 167 = 121 + 36 + 9 + 1.

167 is a full reptend prime in base 10, since the decimal expansion of 1/167 repeats the following 166 digits: 0.00598802395209580838323353293413173652694610778443113772455089820359281437125748502994 0119760479041916167664670658682634730538922155688622754491017964071856287425149700...

167 is a highly cototient number, as it is the smallest number k with exactly 15 solutions to the equation x - φ(x) = k. It is also a strictly non-palindromic number.

167 is the smallest multi-digit prime such that the product of digits is equal to the number of digits times the sum of the digits, i. e., 1×6×7 = 3×(1+6+7)

167 is the smallest positive integer d such that the imaginary quadratic field Q() has class number = 11.

In astronomy
 167 Urda is a main belt asteroid
 167P/CINEOS is a periodic comet in the Solar System
 IC 167 is interacting galaxies

In the military
 Marine Light Attack Helicopter Squadron 167 is a United States Marine Corps helicopter squadron
 Martin Model 167 was a U.S.-designed light bomber during World War II
  was a U.S. Navy Diver-class rescue and salvage ship during World War II
  was a U.S. Navy  during World War II
  was a U.S. Navy  during World War II
  was a U.S. Navy  during World War I
  was a U.S. Navy  during World War II
  was a transport ship during World War II
  was a U.S. Navy  during World War II

In sports
 Martina Navratilova has 167 tennis titles, an all-time record for men or women

In transportation
 London Buses route 167
 167th Street is an elevated local station in the Bronx on the IRT Jerome Avenue Line, of the New York City Subway.
 167th Street is an underground local station in the Bronx on the IND Concourse Line, of the New York City Subway.
 List of highways numbered 167

In other fields
167 is also:
 The year AD 167 or 167 BC
 The Universal Disk Format (or ECMA-167) format of a file system for optical media storage
 C167 family is a 16-bit microcontroller architecture from Infineon
 Pips are dots on the face of a die, denoting its value. The pip count at the start of a backgammon game is 167

See also
 M167 (disambiguation)
 List of highways numbered 167
 United States Supreme Court cases, Volume 167
 United Nations Security Council Resolution 167

External links

 Prime curiosities: 167

References 

Integers